Pavlo Dmitrovich Petrenko is Ukrainian politician, jurist, lawyer.

MP of Ukraine 7th convocation. Minister of Justice of Ukraine from 27 February 2014 until 29 August 2019.

Education 
After secondary education, he entered the law faculty of Chernivtsi National University, handicrafts, graduating with honors in 2001 and was educated in the specialty "Jurisprudence". Has the educational qualification of Master of Laws degree.

In 2004 he received the diploma of the Ukrainian Academy of Foreign Trade under the Ministry of Economy of Ukraine in "Management".

In 2014 he received a Candidate of Sciences degree in juridical sciences.

Career 
Work began legal counsel for private law firms, and in December 2001 became General Counsel of State Savings Bank of Ukraine, where he continued to work until 2005 in senior positions in the department of legal support.

From 2006 to 2010, engaged in the practice of law.

Since 2009 he has been a member of the political party "Front of Changes", was a bureau of the party and led the legal department.

In November 2010 he was elected a deputy of the Kyiv Regional Council, member of the standing committee on law and order and fighting corruption.

In the parliamentary elections in December 2012 has held the position of Head of Legal Department of the United Opposition "Batkivshchyna". From 12 December 2012 – Deputy of Ukraine of the 7th convocation of the party "Batkivshchyna", № 52 on the list. Secretary of the Parliamentary Committee on the rule of law and justice.

15 June 2013, after the unification of the "Front of Changes" and the "Batkivshchyna" was chosen as one of the deputy leader of the "Batkivshchyna".

In September 2014 Petrenko became a founding member of his new party People's Front.

Petrenko took part in the July 2019 Ukrainian parliamentary election with the party Ukrainian Strategy. But in the election they won 2.41% of the votes, less than half if the 5% election threshold, and thus no parliamentary seats.

References

External links 
 Biography

1979 births
Politicians from Chernivtsi
Living people
Front for Change (Ukraine) politicians
All-Ukrainian Union "Fatherland" politicians
People's Front (Ukraine) politicians
Chernivtsi University alumni
Seventh convocation members of the Verkhovna Rada
21st-century Ukrainian politicians
Justice ministers of Ukraine
21st-century Ukrainian lawyers